Kontakte ("Contacts") is an electronic music work by Karlheinz Stockhausen, realized in 1958–60 at the Westdeutscher Rundfunk (WDR) electronic-music studio in Cologne with the assistance of Gottfried Michael Koenig.

David Stubbs has referred to the 1960 recording as "a classic of early electronics" and a piece of musique concrète which aimed to disregard all received notions found in musical narrative, adding it was "[a]n attempt at a new musical lexicon that was never really followed through."

Work history
The title of the work "refers both to contacts between instrumental and electronic sound groups and to contacts between self-sufficient, strongly characterized moments. In the case of four-channel loudspeaker reproduction, it also refers to contacts between various forms of spatial movement". The composition exists in two forms: (1) for electronic sounds alone, designated "Nr. 12" in the composer's catalog of works, and (2) for electronic sounds, piano, and percussion, designated "Nr. 12½".. A further, theatrical work, Originale (Nr. 12⅔), composed in 1961, incorporates all of the second version of Kontakte.

Section and subsection numbers
The score is divided into sixteen sections with many subsections, numbered I A–F, II, III, IV A–F, V A–F, VI, VII A–F,VIII A–F, IX A–F, X, XI A–F, XII A1BA2, XIII A, Ab, Ad, Ae, Af B–F, XIV, XV A–F, and XVI A–E [and F].

Technique and form
According to the composer, "In the preparatory work for my composition Kontakte, I found, for the first time, ways to bring all properties [i.e., timbre, pitch, intensity, and duration] under a single control", thereby realizing a longstanding goal of total serialism. On the other hand, "Kontakte is arguably the last of Stockhausen's tape pieces in which serial proportions intervene decisively at anything but the broad formal level". The most famous moment, at the very center of the work, is a potent illustration of these connections: a high, bright, slowly wavering pitch descends in several waves, becoming louder as it gradually acquires a snarling timbre, and finally passes below the point where it can be heard any longer as a pitch. As it crosses this threshold, it becomes evident that the sound consists of a succession of pulses, which continue to slow until they become a steady beat. With increasing reverberation, the individual pulses become transformed into tones once again.

Stockhausen also made advances over his previous electronic composition, Gesang der Jünglinge, in the realm of spatial composition, adding the parameters of spatial location, group type, register, and speed. Kontakte is composed in four channels, with loudspeakers placed at the corners of a square surrounding the audience. With the aid of a "rotation table", consisting of a rotatable loudspeaker surrounded by four microphones, he was able to send sounds through and around the auditorium with unprecedented variety.

Editions
There are several published editions of the score, in part because of the two versions of the piece, and in part because of the transfer of copyright from Universal Edition to the Stockhausen-Verlag in the mid 1990s. Universal Edition refers to both versions of the work as No. 12, whereas the Stockhausen-Verlag distinguishes the electroacoustic version as No. 12½.

 Stockhausen, Karlheinz. 1966. Kontakte Nr. 12: für elektronische Klänge, Klavier und Schlagzeug: Aufführungspartitur. UE 14246 LW. London: Universal Edition.
 Stockhausen, Karlheinz. 1968. Kontakte: elektronische Musik, Nr. 12. (Realisation Score). UE 13678 LW; 14246 LW. London: Universal Edition 
 Stockhausen, Karlheinz. 1995. Kontakte: für elektronische Klänge, Klavier und Schlagzeug: 1958–60, Werk Nr. 12½, new edition. Kürten: Stockhausen-Verlag.
 Stockhausen, Karlheinz. 2008. Kontakte (Realisation Score), second edition, English version. Kürten: Stockhausen-Verlag.
 Stockhausen, Karlheinz. 2008. Kontakte (Realisationspartitur), second edition, German version. Kürten: Stockhausen-Verlag.

Filmography
Brandt, Brian, and Michael Hynes (prod.). 2014. Stockhausen: Complete Early Percussion Works. Steven Schick, James Avery, Red Fish Blue Fish. DVD recording, region 0, NTSC, Dolby 5.1 surround/DTS 5.1 surround, aspect ratio 16:9, color. Mode 274. New York: Mode Records.

References

Cited sources

Further reading

 Anon. 1960. "Cologne—Meeting Place of Modern Music". The New York Times (24 April): X12.
 Assis, Gustavo Oliveira Alfaix. 2011. Em busca do som: A música de Karlheinz Stockhausen nos anos 1950. São Paulo: Editora UNESP. .
 Austin, Kevin. 2010. "Kontakte by Karlheinz Stockhausen in Four Channels.” eContact! 12.4 — Perspectives on the Electroacoustic Work / Perspectives sur l'œuvre électroacoustique (August). Montréal: CEC.
 Beaucage, Réjean. 2005. "Contact avec / Contact with Stockhausen", English translation by Jane Brierley. La Scena Musicale 11, no. 3 (November): 18–25.
 Blumröder, Christoph von. 1984. "Serielle Musik um 1960: Stockhausens Kontakte". In Analysen: Beiträge zu einer Problemgeschichte des Komponierens. Festschrift für Hans Heinrich Eggebrecht zum 65. Geburtstag, edited by Reinhold Brinkmann, Elmar Budde, and Werner Breig, 423–435. Supplements to the Archiv für Musikwissenschaft 23. Stuttgart: F. Steiner Verlag. .
 Blumröder, Christoph von. 1993. "Karlheinz Stockhausen—40 Jahre Elektronische Musik." Archiv für Musikwissenschaft 50, no. 4:309–323.
 Dack, John. 1998. "Strategies in the Analysis of Stockhausen's Kontakte." Journal of New Music Research 27:84–119. ISSN 0929-8215.
 Hansen, Finn Egeland. 1990. "Tropering: Et kompositionsprincip." Festskrift Søren Sørensen: 1920. 29 September 1990, edited by Finn Egeland Hansen, Steen Pade, Christian Thodberg and Arthur Ilfeldt, 185–205. Copenhagen: Fog. .
 Huang, Zhenyu (黄枕宇). 2002. 从两部作品的比较看西方电子音乐早期发展(上)(下) [An Examination of the Early Development of Western Electronic Music through Comparison of two Electronic Compositions]. Zhongyang Yinyue Xueyuan xuebao/Journal of the Central Conservatory of Music 2, no. 87 (Summer): 58–67 and no. 88 (Fall): 58–67.
 Kelsall, John. 1975. "Compositional Techniques in the Music of Stockhausen (1951–1970)". PhD diss. Glasgow: University of Glasgow.
 Kirchmeyer, Helmut. 1963. "Zur Entstehungs- und Problemgeschichte der Kontakte von Karlheinz Stockhausen". Liner notes for Stockhausen, Kontakte, David Tudor (piano and percussion) and Christoph Caskel (percussion). Wergo-Studienreihe für Neue Musik LP, WER 60 009. Reprinted in Neuland Jahrbuch 3 (1982–83): 152–176.
 Kramer, Jonathan. 1978. "Moment Form in Twentieth Century Music." The Musical Quarterly 64, no. 2 (April): 177–194.
 Mackay, Duncan Maclean. 1983. "Concepts of Dualism in the Works of Stockhausen." M.M. thesis. University of East Anglia.
 Marvin, Elizabeth West. 1995. "Generalization of Contour Theory to Diverse Musical Spaces: Analytical Applications to the Music of Dallapiccola and Stockhausen." Concert Music, Rock, and Jazz Since 1945: Essays and Analytical Studies, edited by Elizabeth West Marvin and Richard Hermann, 135–171. Eastman Studies in Music 2. Rochester: University of Rochester Press. .
 Mowitz, Michael. 2002. Die Form der Unendlichkeit: Aspekte der Momentform und der seriellen Struktur in Karlheinz Stockhausens Kontakte. Essen: Die Blaue Eule. .
 Pécquet, Franck. 1998. "Espace et représentation sonore." In L'espace: Musique/philosophie: Paris, 1997, edited by Jean-Marc Chouvel and Makīs Solōmos, 187–194. Musique et musicologie: Les dialogues. Paris: L'Harmattan. .
 Perle, George. 1960. "Current Chronicle: Germany". The Musical Quarterly 46, no. 4 (October): 517–525.
 Rea, John. 2009. "On Stockhausen's Kontakte (1959–60) for Tape, Piano and Percussion: A Lecture/Analysis by John Rea Given at the University of Toronto, March 1968". Circuit: Musiques Contemporaines 19, no. 2:77–86.
 Schatt, Peter W. 1988. "Tendenzen des Materials in Stockhausens Kontakten". Archiv für Musikwissenschaft 45, no. 3:206–223.
 Skowron, Zbigniew. 1982. "Muzyka elektroniczna Karlheinza Stockhausena. II: Utwory z lat 1955–67" [Karlheinz Stockhausen's Electronic Music II: Works from 1955–67]. Muzyka: Kwartalnik Poświęcony Historii i Teorii Muzyki 27, nos. 1–2:11–36.
 Stockhausen, Karlheinz. 1963a. "Momentform: Neue Beziehungen zwischen Aufführungsdauer, Werkdauer und Moment". In his Texte zur Musik 1, edited by Dieter Schnebel, 189–210. DuMont Dokumente. Cologne: Verlag M. DuMont Schauberg.
 Stockhausen, Karlheinz. 1963b. "Erfindung und Entdeckung", in his Texte zur Musik 1, edited by Dieter Schnebel, 222–58. DuMont Dokumente. Cologne: Verlag M. DuMont Schauberg.
 Stockhausen, Karlheinz. 1996. "Electroacoustic Performance Practice", translated by Jerome Kohl. Perspectives of New Music 34, no. 1 (Fall): 74–105.
 Stockhausen, Karlheinz. 1998. "Bildung ist große Arbeit: Karlheinz Stockhausen im Gespräch mit Studierenden des Musikwissenschaftlichen Instituts der Universität zu Köln am 5. Februar 1997." In Stockhausen 70: Das Programmbuch Köln 1998. Signale aus Köln: Musik der Zeit 1, edited by Imke Misch and Christoph von Blumröder, 1–36. Saarbrücken: Pfau-Verlag. .
 Stockhausen, Karlheinz. 2009. Kompositorische Grundlagen Neuer Musik: Sechs Seminare für die Darmstädter Ferienkurse 1970, edited by Imke Misch. Kürten: Stockhausen-Stiftung für Musik. .

Compositions by Karlheinz Stockhausen
Chamber music by Karlheinz Stockhausen
1960 compositions
Serial compositions
Electronic compositions
Spatial music
Music with dedications
Process music pieces
Musique concrète